The men's shot put event was part of the track and field athletics programme at the 1936 Summer Olympics. The competition was held on 2 August 1936. Twenty-two athletes from 14 nations competed. The maximum number of athletes per nation had been set at 3 since the 1930 Olympic Congress. The final was won by Hans Woellke of Germany. It was Germany's first victory in the men's shot put, and first medal since bronze in 1928. Germany also received bronze in 1936, with Gerhard Stöck finishing third. Between the two Germans was Sulo Bärlund of Finland with silver, the nation's first medal in the event since gold in 1920. For the first time, the United States won no medals in the men's shot put, with the three Americans finishing 4th, 5th, and 6th.

Background

This was the 10th appearance of the event, which is one of 12 athletics events to have been held at every Summer Olympics. Returning shot putters from the 1932 Games were bronze medalist František Douda of Czechoslovakia, sixth-place finisher Hans-Heinrich Sievert of Germany, eighth-place finisher József Darányi of Hungary, tenth-place finisher Jules Noël of France, and fifteenth-place finisher Antônio Lira of Brazil. Douda had held the world record from late 1932 to early 1934, but Jack Torrance of the United States had set a record in 1934 that would last until 1948. Torrance was favored in Berlin, slightly ahead of Hans Woellke of host Germany.

Afghanistan, the Republic of China, and Japan each made their debut in the men's shot put. The United States appeared for the 10th time, the only nation to have competed in all Olympic shot put competitions to date.

Competition format

The competition introduced a true two-round format, with the qualifying round completely separate from the divided final (though the official report describes the competition as having three phases, with the final being a "semi-finals" and "final"). In qualifying, each athlete received three attempts; those recording a mark of at least 14.50 metres advanced to the final. The results of the qualifying round were then ignored. Finalists received three throws each, with the top six competitors receiving an additional three attempts. The best distance among those six throws counted.

Records

These were the standing world and Olympic records (in metres) prior to the 1936 Summer Olympics.

Sulo Bärlund broke the Olympic record with a throw of 16.03 metres in the second throw of the final. This record lasted until the fifth throw, when Bärlund throw 16.12 and Hans Woellke threw 16.20 metres.

Schedule

Results

Qualifying

Final

References

Athletics at the 1936 Summer Olympics
Shot put at the Olympics
Men's events at the 1936 Summer Olympics